The following elections occurred in the year 1936.

Asia
 1936 Ceylonese State Council election

Europe
 1936 Belgian general election
 1936 Bielsko municipal election
 1936 Danish Landsting election
 1936 Finnish parliamentary election
 1936 French legislative election
 1936 German election and referendum
 1936 Greek legislative election
 1936 Liechtenstein general election 
 1936 Lithuanian parliamentary election 
 1936 Norwegian parliamentary election
 1936 Spanish general election
 1936 Swedish general election

United Kingdom
 1936 Combined Scottish Universities by-election
 1936 Greenock by-election
 1936 Preston by-election
 1936 Ross and Cromarty by-election

North America

Canada
 1936 Conservative Party of Ontario leadership election
 1936 Edmonton municipal election
 1936 Manitoba general election
 1936 Ottawa municipal election
 1936 Quebec general election
 December 1936 Toronto municipal election
 January 1936 Toronto municipal election

Central America
 1936 Honduran Constituent Assembly election
 1936 Honduran presidential election
 1936 Nicaraguan general election
 1936 Nicaraguan presidential election
 1936 Panamanian general election
 1936 Salvadoran legislative election

United States
1936 United States Presidential Election
United States House of Representatives elections in California, 1936
1936 Louisiana gubernatorial election
1936 Minnesota gubernatorial election
1936 New York state election
United States House of Representatives elections in South Carolina, 1936
1936 United States House of Representatives elections
1936 United States Senate elections

United States Senate
 1936 United States Senate elections
 United States Senate election in Massachusetts, 1936
 United States Senate election in South Carolina, 1936

South America 
 1936 Argentine legislative election

Oceania

Australia
 1936 Western Australian state election

See also
 :Category:1936 elections

1936
Elections